Psammodynastes pulverulentus, the common mock viper, is a species of snake native to Asia.

Distribution
The common mock viper is known from Bangladesh, Myanmar (Burma), Cambodia, China (Fujian, Yunnan, Guangxi, Guangdong, Hainan,Hong Kong), north-eastern India (Assam, Sikkim, Darjelling;Jalpaiguri; Meghalaya, Arunachal Pradesh), Bhutan, Indonesia (Bali, Bangka, Borneo, Butung, Enggano, Flores, Java, Kalimantan, Komodo, Lombok, Mentawai Archipelago, Natuna Archipelago, Padar, Riau Archipelago, Rinca, Sangihe Archipelago, Sulawesi, Sula Archipelago, Sumatra, Sumba, Sumbawa, Togian Archipelago), Laos,  Malaysia (Malaya and East Malaysia, Pulau Tioman), Nepal, the Philippines  (Balabac, Basilan, Bohol, Bongao, Busuanga, Dinagat, Jolo, Leyte, Luzon, Mindanao, Negros, Palawan, Panay, Polillo, Samar), Taiwan, Thailand (incl. Phuket), and Vietnam. It has been reported from Singapore.

Subspecies Psammodynastes pulverulentus papenfussi is endemic to Taiwan.

Gallery

References
https://www.iucnredlist.org/species/184062/1746457

External links

 Reptiles in Hong Kong – Psammodynastes pulverulentus (Boie, 1827), Mock Viper 紫沙蛇
 Mock Viper - Thailand

Pseudaspididae
Snakes of Asia
Reptiles of Bangladesh
Reptiles of Cambodia
Snakes of China
Reptiles of India
Reptiles of Indonesia
Reptiles of Laos
Reptiles of Malaysia
Reptiles of Myanmar
Reptiles of Nepal
Reptiles of the Philippines
Reptiles of Taiwan
Reptiles of Thailand
Snakes of Vietnam
Taxa named by Friedrich Boie
Reptiles described in 1827
Reptiles of Borneo